Bongiovi is a surname. Notable people with the surname include:

John Francis Bongiovi Jr. (born 1962), American singer-songwriter, record producer, philanthropist, and actor
Nina Yang Bongiovi, Asian American film producer
Tony Bongiovi (born 1947), American record producer

See also
 Bon Jovi (disambiguation)